This timeline documents all of the events of the 2016 Pacific typhoon season. Most of the tropical cyclones forming between May and November. The scope of this article is limited to the Pacific Ocean, north of the equator between 100°E and the International Date Line. Tropical storms that form in the entire Western Pacific basin are assigned a name by the Japan Meteorological Agency. Tropical depressions that form in this basin are given a number with a "W" suffix by the United States' Joint Typhoon Warning Center. In addition, the Philippine Atmospheric, Geophysical and Astronomical Services Administration (PAGASA) assigns names to tropical cyclones (including tropical depressions) that enter or form in the Philippine area of responsibility. These names, however, are not in common use outside of the Philippines.

During the season, 50 systems were designated as Tropical Depressions by either, the Japan Meteorological Agency (JMA), the Philippine Atmospheric, Geophysical and Astronomical Services Administration (PAGASA), the Joint Typhoon Warning Center (JTWC), or other National Meteorological and Hydrological Services such as the China Meteorological Administration and the Hong Kong Observatory. As they run the Regional Specialized Meteorological Centre for the Western Pacific, the JMA assigns names to Tropical Depressions should they intensify into a tropical storm. PAGASA also assign local names to tropical depressions which form within their area of responsibility; however, these names are not in common use outside of PAGASA's area of responsibility. In this season, 14 systems entered or formed in the Philippine area of responsibility, which 7 of them directly made landfall over the Philippines.

Timeline of events

January
January 1
The 2016 Pacific typhoon season officially begins, though no systems have developed for the course of five months.

May
May 25
18:00 UTC at  — Tropical Depression 01W develops from an area of low-pressure over in the South China Sea.

May 27
06:00 UTC at  — Tropical Depression 01W reaches peak intensity with a minimum pressure of 1000 hPa while making landfall near Yanjiang, Guandong.
18:00 UTC at  — Tropical Depression 01W weakens to a low-pressure area inland China.

June

June 25
18:00 UTC at  — Another tropical depression develops in the South China Sea to northeast of Samar.

June 26
06:00 UTC at  — The Philippine Atmospheric, Geophysical and Astronomical Services Administration (PAGASA) starts initiating advisories on the depression, receiving the local name Ambo while it was located about 182 km (113 mi) to the east of Virac, Catanduanes.
06:00 UTC at  — The JMA follows suit and starts initiating advisories on Tropical Depression Ambo.
14:00 UTC at  — Tropical Depression Ambo makes landfall over in Dinalungan, Aurora. The PAGASA in the same time downgraded Ambo to a low-pressure area and stopped warning on the system.

June 27
00:00 UTC at  — Tropical Depression Ambo enters the South China Sea.

June 28
00:00 UTC at  — Tropical Depression Ambo makes landfall over in Guangdong as it was absorbed by a stationary front. The JMA stops tracking on the system.

July
July 2
12:00 UTC at  — A tropical depression has developed approximately 780 km (485 mi) to the southeast of Yap State.

July 3
00:00 UTC at  — The Joint Typhoon Warning Center (JTWC) starts initiating advisories giving the designation of 02W as it was located about 485 nmi (558 mi; 895 km) south of Guam.
00:00 UTC at  — The tropical depression intensifies into a tropical storm, with the JMA naming it as Nepartak.
03:00 UTC at  — The JTWC upgrades Nepartak to a tropical storm as it was located about 47 nmi (54 mi; 87 km) northeast of Faraulep.

July 4
12:00 UTC at  — Nepartak intensifies into a severe tropical storm by the JMA.

July 5
00:00 UTC at  — According to the JMA, Nepartak strengthens into a typhoon.
03:00 UTC at  — The PAGASA starts issuing advisories on Nepartak, which was also given the local name Butchoy as it was located about 1,570 km (975 mi) east of Baler, Aurora.
03:00 UTC at  — The JTWC now classifies Nepartak (Butchoy) as a Category 1 typhoon about 1,033 nmi (1,189 mi; 1,913 km) southeast of Taipei, Taiwan.
06:00 UTC at  — Typhoon Nepartak (Butchoy) intensifies into a Category 2 by the JTWC.
12:00 UTC at  — Typhoon Nepartak (Butchoy) undergoes rapid deepening and was quickly upgraded to a Category 4 typhoon with 120 kt (220 km/h; 140 mph) located about 821 nmi (945 mi; 1,520 km) east-southeast of Taipei, Taiwan.
18:00 UTC at  — Nepartak (Butchoy) further strengthens into a Super typhoon with winds of 130 kt (240 km/h; 150 mph) located about 715 nmi (823 mi; 1,324 km) southeast of Taipei, Taiwan.

July 6
00:00 UTC at  — Super Typhoon Nepartak (Butchoy) further reaches Category 5 super typhoon intensity by the JTWC as it was approximately located 613 nmi (705 mi; 1,135 km) southeast of Taipei, Taiwan.
06:00 UTC at  — The JMA assessed that Nepartak (Butchoy) reached and maintained its peak intensity with 10-minute sustained winds of 110 kt (205 km/h; 125 mph) and a minimum barometric pressure of 900 hPa (26.87 inHg).
18:00 UTC at  — Super Typhoon Nepartak (Butchoy) reaches peak intensity from the JTWC with 1-minute sustained winds with 150 kt (280 km/h; 170 mph) about 348 nmi (400 mi; 644 km) southeast of Taipei, Taiwan.
July 7
18:00 UTC at  — After 24 hours of maintaining its peak intensity, Nepartak (Butchoy) finally starts to weaken and the JTWC downgraded it to a Category 4 super typhoon as it was located about 163 nmi (188 mi; 302 km) south of Taipei, Taiwan.
21:50 UTC (05:50 CST, July 8) at  — Typhoon Nepartak (Butchoy) makes landfall over in Taimali, Taitung.

July 8
00:00 UTC at  — Nepartak (Butchoy) rapidly weakens to a Category 2 typhoon about 155 nmi (178 mi; 287 km) south-southwest of Taipei, Taiwan.
06:00 UTC at  — The PAGASA issues its final bulletin on Nepartak (Butchoy) as it was located outside their area of responsibility.
06:00 UTC at  — Typhoon Nepartak further weakens to a Category 1 about 149 nmi (171 mi; 276 km) to the southwest of Taipei, Taiwan.
12:00 UTC at  — The JMA downgrades Nepartak to a severe tropical storm.
18:00 UTC at  — Severe Tropical Storm Nepartak weakens into a tropical storm by the JMA.

July 9
00:00 UTC at  — The JTWC further downgrades Nepartak to a tropical storm as it was located about 143 nmi (164 mi; 265 km) west-southwest of Taipei, Taiwan.
05:45 UTC (13:45 CST) at  — Tropical Storm Nepartak makes landfall over in Shishi, Fujian in China.
06:00 UTC at  — Tropical Storm Nepartak weakens into a tropical depression by the JMA.
06:00 UTC at  — The JTWC issues their final advisory on Nepartak as it was located about 168 nmi (193 mi; 311 km) west of Taipei, Taiwan.

July 10
00:00 UTC at  — The JMA stops tracking on Tropical Depression Nepartak as it fully dissipates over land.

July 16
12:00 UTC at  — Another tropical depression had developed approximately 535 nmi (991 mi; 616 km) south-southeast of Kadena Air Base, Okinawa.

July 17
06:00 UTC at  — The JTWC gives the identifier 03W to the tropical depression as it moved northwards located about 392 nmi (451 mi; 726 km) south-southeast of Kadena Air Base, Okinawa.
12:00 UTC at  — The JTWC issues its final advisory on Tropical Depression 03W with winds of only 45 km/h (30 mph) as it was located about 313 nmi (360 mi; 580 mi) south-southeast of Kadena Air Base, Okinawa.

July 20
06:00 UTC at  — Tropical Depression 03W fully dissipates near the Tokara Islands in the Japanese group of the Ryukyu Islands.

July 22
18:00 UTC at  — The JMA starts to track a tropical depression over in the Pacific Northwest.

July 23
12:00 UTC at  — The JTWC immediately classifies the system as Tropical Storm 04W, located about 772 nmi (888 mi; 1,430 km) east-northeast of Iwo To, Japan.
18:00 UTC at  — Tropical Storm 04W becomes a named storm with the latter naming Lupit.

July 24
00:00 UTC at  — Tropical Storm Lupit reaches maximum intensity from the JTWC, located about 455 nmi (524 mi; 843 km) north-northwest of Minami-Tori-Shima.
00:00 UTC at  — Tropical Storm Lupit reaches maximum intensity with 10-minute winds of 40 kt (75 km/h; 45 mph) and a minimum barometric pressure of 1000 hPa (29.53 inHg).
06:00 UTC at  — The JTWC issues its final warning on Tropical Storm Lupit as it starts to become extratropical as it was located about 985 nmi (1,133 mi; 1,824 km) east of Yokosuka, Japan.
18:00 UTC at  — Tropical Storm Lupit becomes fully extratropical.

July 25
12:00 UTC at  — Tropical Depression 05W develops about 314 nmi (361 mi; 582 km) to the south of Hong Kong.
12:00 UTC at  — The JMA starts to track Tropical Depression 05W as it was also over in the west coast of Luzon, Philippines.

July 26
06:00 UTC at  — The extratropical remnants of Lupit fully dissipates.
06:00 UTC at  — Tropical Depression 05W becomes a tropical storm by both agencies and was named Mirinae while located about 132 nmi (152 mi; 244 km) southeast of Haikou.

July 27
00:00 UTC at  — Tropical Storm Mirinae weakens slightly as it crosses Hainan Island and was located about 176 nmi (202 mi; 326 km) east-southeast of Hanoi, Vietnam.
12:00 UTC at  — Severe Tropical Storm Mirinae reaches peak intensity with 10-minute winds of 55 kn (100 km/h; 65 mph) and a minimum pressure of 980 hPa (28.94 inHg) as it entered the Gulf of Tonkin.
12:00 UTC at  — The JTWC issues their final advisory on Tropical Storm Mirinae about 58 nmi (67 mi; 107 km) south-south east of Hanoi, Vietnam.
18:00 UTC at  — Tropical Storm Mirinae finally weakens to a tropical storm as it made landfall about 110 km (70 mi) to the south of Hanoi.

July 28
06:00 UTC at  — While moving northward, the JMA downgrades the storm to Tropical Depression Mirinae.
18:00 UTC at  — Tropical Depression Mirinae fully dissipates to the north of Hanoi.

July 29
00:00 UTC at  — Tropical Depression Carina develops about 195 km (121 mi) east of Borongan, Eastern Samar.
12:00 UTC at  — The JMA starts tracking on Tropical Depression Carina.
12:00 UTC at  — The JTWC gives the identifier 06W as it was located about 394 nmi (453 mi; 730 km) east-southeast of Manila, Philippines.

July 30
06:00 UTC at  — Tropical Depression 06W (Carina) intensifies into Tropical Storm Nida from the JMA.
12:00 UTC at  — The JTWC upgrades Tropical Storm Nida (Carina) to a tropical storm as it was located about 258 nmi (297 mi; 478 km) east-northeast of Manila.

July 31
00:00 UTC at  — Tropical Storm Nida (Carina) intensifies into a severe tropical storm.
05:20 UTC (13:20 PST) at  — Severe Tropical Storm Nida (Carina) makes landfall between Baggao and Gattaran, Cagayan.
06:00 UTC at  — Severe Tropical Storm Nida (Carina) intensifies into a Category 1 typhoon by the JTWC about 231 nmi (266 mi; 428 km) north-northeast of Manila, Philippines.
06:00 UTC at  — Severe Tropical Storm Nida (Carina) reaches maximum intensity with 10-minute winds of 60 kn (110 km/h; 70 mph) and a minimum pressure of 975 hPa (28.79 inHg).

August
August 1
12:00 UTC at  — Severe Tropical Storm Nida (Carina) reaches peak intensity from the JTWC with 1-minute sustained winds of 80 kn (150 km/h; 90 mph) as it was located about 103 nmi (118 mi; 191 km) east-southeast of Hong Kong.
13:00 UTC at  — Severe Tropical Storm Nida (Carina) exits the Philippine area of responsibility.
19:35 UTC (03:35 CST, August 2) at  — Severe Tropical Storm Nida makes landfall over in the Dapeng Peninsula of Shenzhen, Guandong.

August 2
00:00 UTC at  — Severe Tropical Storm Nida weakens to a tropical storm while traversing the South China Sea.
00:00 UTC at  — The JTWC issues its final warning on Tropical Storm Nida.
12:00 UTC at  — The JMA downgrades Nida to a tropical depression as it is over land.
12:00 UTC at  — A tropical depression has developed to the northeast of Hagåtña, Guam.

August 3
00:00 UTC at  — Tropical Depression Nida fully dissipates over inland China.

August 4
00:00 UTC at  — The JMA upgrades the tropical depression to a tropical storm and was named Omais.
06:00 UTC at  — The JTWC starts issuing advisories on Tropical Storm Omais, giving the identifier of 07W as it was located about 223 nmi (257 mi; 413 km) to the north of Saipan.

August 5
12:00 UTC at  — Tropical Storm Omais intensifies into a severe tropical storm.

August 6
06:00 UTC at  — Severe Tropical Storm Omais reaches peak intensity with winds of 60 kn (110 km/h; 70 mph) and a pressure of 975 hPa (28.79 inHg) as it was located about 731 nm (841 mi; 1354 km) southeast of Yokosuka, Japan.
18:00 UTC at  — Severe Tropical Storm Omais begins to weaken from its peak as it was located about 603 nmi (694 mi; 1,117 km) to the southeast of Yokosuka, Japan.

August 7
12:00 UTC at  — Another tropical depression has developed well west of Wake Island.

August 8
06:00 UTC at  — The tropical depression about 344 nmi (396 mi; 697 km) west-southwest of Wake Island becomes Tropical Depression 08W.
18:00 UTC at  — Severe Tropical Storm Omais moves further northward as the JTWC issues their final advisory, while located 295 nmi (339 mi; 546 km) east-northeast of Yokosuka, Japan.

August 9
00:00 UTC at  — Tropical Depression 08W intensifies into Tropical Storm Conson.
12:00 UTC at  — The JTWC upgrades Conson to a tropical storm while located about 364 nmi (419 mi; 674 km) north-northwest of Enewetak Atoll.
12:00 UTC at  — The JMA issues its final advisory as Omais becomes extratropical.

August 12
00:00 UTC at  — The JMA starts to track a tropical depression near Guam.
06:00 UTC at  — Extratropical Storm Omais exits the basin as it was near the International Dateline.

August 13
06:00 UTC at  — The JTWC starts tracking the system near Guam and becomes Tropical Depression 09W, located about 365 nmi (420 mi; 676 km) south of Iwo To.
12:00 UTC at  — Tropical Storm Conson reaches peak intensity with 10-minute winds of 45 kn (85 km/h; 50 mph) and a minimum pressure of 985 hPa (29.09 inHg).
12:00 UTC at  — The tropical depression near China fully dissipates over land.
18:00 UTC at  — The JTWC assesses Conson's peak with 1-minute winds of 50 kn (95 km/h; 60 mph) located about 613 nmi (705 mi; 1,135 km) east of Yokosuka, Japan.
18:00 UTC at  — Tropical Depression 09W intensifies into Tropical Storm Chanthu.

August 14
12:00 UTC at  — The JTWC issues their final advisory on Tropical Storm Conson as it was located about 306 nmi (352 mi; 567 km) to the east of Misawa, Japan.
18:00 UTC at  — Tropical Storm Chanthu intensifies into a severe tropical storm.
August 15
00:00 UTC at  — Tropical Storm Conson becomes fully extratropical as it made landfall over Nemuro Peninsula.

August 16
12:00 UTC at  — Extratropical Storm Conson fully dissipates near Russian Far East.

September

October

November

December
December 31
The 2016 Pacific typhoon season ends as the 2017 Pacific typhoon season begins.

See also

Timeline of the 2016 Pacific hurricane season
Timeline of the 2016 Atlantic hurricane season

References

External links

τ
Pacific typhoon season meteorological timelines
2016 WPac T